G. colombiana  may refer to:

 Gibberula colombiana, a marine sea snail in the family Cystiscidae
 Grias colombiana,  a species of woody plant in the family Lecythidaceae found only in Colombia

See also 
 Colombiana (disambiguation)